HD 290327 is a single star in the equatorial constellation of Orion. It has a yellow hue with an apparent visual magnitude of 8.99, which is too faint to be viewed with the naked eye. Parallax measurements provide a distance estimate of 184 light years from the Sun. It is drifting away with a radial velocity of +29.5 km/s, having come to within  around a million years ago.

Kazanasmas (1973) found a stellar classification of G5IV for this object, matching a G-type star that is evolving along the subgiant branch. It was later given a class of G8V, suggesting it is instead a G-type main-sequence star. This object is nearly twelve billion years old and is spinning slowly with a projected rotational velocity of 1.4 km/s. The star has 86% of the mass of the Sun and 95% of the Sun's radius. It is radiating 75% of the luminosity of the Sun from its photosphere at an effective temperature of 5,525 K. The metallicity is sub-solar, meaning it has a lower abundance of elements other than hydrogen and helium compared to the Sun.

In 2009, a gas giant planet was found in orbit around the star.

See also 
 List of extrasolar planets

References 

G-type subgiants
G-type main-sequence stars
Planetary systems with one confirmed planet
Orion (constellation)
Durchmusterung objects
290327
025191